Thomas Colly (by 1513 – 1560 or later), of Dover, Kent, was an English politician.

He was a Member of Parliament (MP) for Dover in April 1554.

References

16th-century deaths
Members of the Parliament of England for Dover
English MPs 1554
Year of birth uncertain